Andrew Proctor is a former professional rugby league footballer who played in the 1990s.

Andy is a senior lecturer at UCLAN's Burnley campus in the School of Sport and Health Sciences, mainly responsible for football coaching, specialising in high performance related modules, and in 2019 taken over as head coach of the Serbia national rugby league team.

References

External links

 Search for "Proctor" at rugbyleagueproject.org

Living people
English rugby league players
Oldham R.L.F.C. players
Place of birth missing (living people)
Rugby league second-rows
Serbia national rugby league team coaches
Wakefield Trinity players
Year of birth missing (living people)